Inha University is a private research university located in Incheon, South Korea.
Known traditionally for research and education in the engineering and physical sciences, the university was established by the first president of South Korea, Syngman Rhee. Inha is a Korean-American collaboration school, even in its name: the Morpheme "In" (인, 仁) comes from the city of Incheon and "Ha" (하, 荷) from Hawaii, USA. Started as a polytechnic university in 1954, named Inha Institute of Technology (Acronym: IIT; Korean, Inha Gonggwa Daehak, colloquially Inhagongdae), the institute has been achieving national recognition and a strong reputation as a technological research university thereafter.

Inha University is the most well-known and #1 university in Incheon area. Inha was ranked top 10 nationwide through decades according to Joongang Ilbo's annual rankings of South Korean universities; ranked 8th in 2017. Also, Inha is a member of GU8.

History

Establishment 
In 1952, in the midst of the Korean War, the first president of Korea, Syngman Rhee proposed the foundation of an educational institute that would provide expertise and hope to a lagging industrial sector. The driving force behind the proposal was the will and determination of a group of Koreans who had emigrated to Hawaii 50 years earlier.

The name 'Inha' comes from the name of 'Incheon' and 'Ha' in Hawaii. In March 1954, with the goal of establishing a world-class engineering university like MIT in the US, Dr. Lee Won Chul, an astronomer who obtained his Ph.D. degree, was the inaugural vice president Lee Ki-bong. On April 24, 1954, he had the entrance ceremony for 179 freshmen. On March 14, 1958, the establishment of a graduate school was approved.

Financial resources for the foundation came from the proceeds of the sale of the Korean Christian Institute, an organization founded and managed by Dr. Rhee for the purpose of educating the children of the original emigrants, donations from Korean emigrants in Hawaii and domestic supporters, and a government subsidy. Along with school site donation from Incheon city, the Ministry of Culture and Education approved the foundation of the Inha Institute in February, 1954.

Institute building construction began in earnest, to finally have the Inha Institute of Technology opened later the same year, in the scheme of the parent 6 Departments of Metallurgical, Mechanical, Mining, Electric, Shipbuilding and Chemical Engineering.

Time of expansion and development 
The Inha Institute of Technology, with its unique history and great mission to foster excellent students who would contribute to the development of the nation's scientific and technological industries, was funded to do so by the help of huge government subsidies and foreign aid from UNESCO and the German government.

In a move to improve the management of the Inha Institute, the Board of Trustees was reorganized and Dr. Choong-Hoon Jo and Dr. Jwa-Kyung Seong assumed the positions of chairman of the board and the dean, respectively. That change brought more energy to the management, and resulted in the introduction of state-of-the-art experimental and research equipment, construction of new school buildings, research centers, practice factories, experimental tanks, library, and gymnasium, and secured excellent professors, contributing to the development of the Korean industry.
With the rapid development of the Inha Institute of Technology, its size and facilities surpassed those of other colleges.

It was inevitable for the institute to be elevated to the status of university, thus in December, 1971, the Ministry of Culture and Education approved the elevation and Dr. Jwa-Kyung Seong took office as the first president, solidifying the basis toward one of the prestigious universities in Korea.

Ultimately on Oct. 2, 2014, in collaboration between Inha University and the Government of Uzbekistan, Inha University in Tashkent, the first South Korean university abroad, has been established, with a view to training professional global IT leaders in the country.
The curriculum and academic program of this newly emerging international university comprise the same as those of Inha University in Korea.

Academic structure 
Inha has 12 colleges in Engineering, Natural Sciences, Economics and Trade, Business Administration, Education, Law, Social Science, Humanities, Human Ecology, and Medicine, and 1 affiliation, 20 departments, 9 major fields of study. Inha University's Graduate school offers 47 fields of study for the Master's program and 41 for the Doctoral program. The Graduate School of Education has 31 majors for its Master's program and research course. The Graduate School of Business Administration offers 1 Master's program and 2 certificate courses and a part-time MBA program. The Graduate School of Engineering offers 14 majors in its Master's program and research courses. The Graduate School of Public Administration has 3 majors in its Master's program and research courses. Founded in 2000, the Graduate School of Information Technology and Telecommunications offers 1 major in its Master's program and the expanded and reorganized Graduate School of International Trade and Logistics now has 2 departments with 5 majors.

Undergraduate colleges 
Inha university consists of 11 undergraduate colleges:
Frontier College
College of Engineering
College of Natural Sciences
College of Business Administration
College of Education
College of Social Sciences
College of Humanities
College of Medicine
College of Future Convergence
Arts and Sports
Global Studies

Graduate schools 
Inha has 9 graduate schools: Graduate School, Graduate School of Information Technology and Telecommunications, Graduate School of Logistics, Law School, School of Medicine, Graduate School of Engineering, Graduate School of Education, Graduate School of Business Administration, Graduate School of Public Administration.

Facilities

Attached agencies 
Inha university has 8 attached agencies which are listed below:

 Jung-Seok Memorial Library
 Language Training Center
 Center for Continuing Education
 Inha Museum
 Teachers Training Center
 Infirmary
 Jungseok Research Institute of International Logistics and Trade
 Christian Missionaries working to convert non-religious and other religious people to Christians

Research institutes 
Inha university has about 60 research institutes attached to it. These institutes are listed below.

Acceptance rate and Ranking 

In 2022, 43,062 applicants applied to 2,631 recruitments for early admission to INHA University, recording a competition rate of 16.37:1 (6.1%). This is the result of an increase of 2.10 points in competition rate from 14.27:1 (7.0%) and the increase in number of applicants by 4,936. Despite the continuous decline in school-age population, it showed the highest competition rate in the pasts four years.

Taejoon Jeon, the director of the Admissions Office, said “Despite various difficult conditions such as a decrease in the school age population and a decrease in the number of early admissions, INHA University's competition for early admissions has risen sharply. This is the result of the recent recognition of INHA University's potential, which has shown excellent business orders in various education and research fields."

Link to Competition Rate by Application Type, by Recruitment Unit:

http://ratio.uwayapply.com/Sl5KOHxXJUpmJSY6JkpwZlRm

INHA University is one of the top private universities in Incheon, South Korea. It is ranked #531-540 in QS World University Rankings 2023.

Notable alumni

References

External links 
 Inha University Homepage, in English
 Inha University in Tashkent Homepage

Inha University
Hanjin Group
1954 establishments in South Korea
Educational institutions established in 1954
Private universities and colleges in South Korea